The table below details the complete World Championship Grand Prix results of the Formula One constructor Brabham between  and . It includes results from the works team as well as privately entered cars. Since the Constructors' Championship points were awarded to chassis-engine combinations rather than entrants, the table is sorted first by engine manufacturer then by entrant.

Complete Formula One World Championship results
(key)

Notes

References

Formula One constructor results